South 9th Street Historic District is a national historic district located at Noblesville, Hamilton County, Indiana.   It encompasses 39 contributing buildings and 1 contributing site in a predominantly residential section of Noblesville. It developed between about 1860 and 1940, and includes notable examples of Queen Anne, Italianate, and Bungalow / American Craftsman style architecture. Notable buildings include the Masonic Temple (c. 1914) and Adler Building (formerly First Christian Church, 1897).

It was listed on the National Register of Historic Places in 2001.

References

Historic districts on the National Register of Historic Places in Indiana
Queen Anne architecture in Indiana
Italianate architecture in Indiana
Historic districts in Hamilton County, Indiana
National Register of Historic Places in Hamilton County, Indiana